Alberto "Abet" S. Uy, (born October 18, 1966), is a Filipino Roman Catholic clergyman who is currently  the Bishop of the Diocese of Tagbilaran in the Philippines.

Episcopacy

Pope Francis announced Uy's appointment as bishop on October 13, 2016.  Uy was consecrated as bishop at the Blessed Trinity Cathedral in Talibon, Bohol, seat of the Diocese of Talibon on January 5, 2017, and was installed as the seventh bishop of the Diocese of Tagbilaran on January 6, 2017 at Cathedral of St. Joseph the Worker in Tagbilaran City. He succeeded retired bishop Leonardo Y. Medroso.

References 

21st-century Roman Catholic bishops in the Philippines
1966 births
Living people
People from Bohol
Visayan people